ND4 can mean several things:
 Neutral density filter (ND) with an attenuation factor of 4, or simply ND4
 MT-ND4, NADH dehydrogenase subunit 4, or simply ND4